Gérard Bourgoin (born 6 July 1939) is a French businessman, sports chairman and politician. He was the president of the French soccer club AJ Auxerre from 24 May 2011 to 19 April 2013.

Career as an entrepreneur 
Gérard Bourgoin was born in Chailley in the department of Yonne, the son of a butcher. He began his training course with a CAP (Certificat d'Aptitude Professionnelle) in butchery and then in accounting. By 1966, he created in his native village of Chailley his first poultry factory named La Chaillotine.

The same year, the family company expanded to become one of the biggest French poultry group. During the 1980s, La Chaillotine changed of name into BSA (Bourgoin SA), diversified and developed in the international field. With the buyout of several companies, BSA became the first worldwide leader of fresh poultry with 30% of the national production, 6,600 employees, 30 factories and a gross revenue of 6.5 billion francs.

Faced to industrial and financial difficulties, the group that he manages with his daughter Corinne Bourgoin, named general director in 1996, is in bankruptcy in August 2000. It is dismantled and the successors share the group together. The company Duc continues to utilize the factory of Chailley.

Career as a football chairman 
Supporter of the AJ Auxerre where he was vice-president, he sponsorized the soccer club by the intermediate of his poultry group ("La Chaillotine" from 1978 to 1983 and from 1986 to 1990, then "Duc de Bourgogne" and "Duc" from 1990 to 1996). He was elected in July 2000 president of the Ligue de Football Professionnel in replacement of Noël Le Graët. His presidency was not successful and was followed by a strong internal opposition. He was then replaced by Frédéric Thiriez.

In May 2011, with the support of Guy Roux and Jean-Claude Hamel, he became president of the AJ Auxerre. He named on 8 June 2011 Laurent Fournier as a new trainer of the club Jean Fernandez, who had his contract ended and left for the AS Nancy.

See also 
AJ Auxerre
National Centre of Independents and Peasants

Bibliography

References 

1939 births
French football chairmen and investors
National Centre of Independents and Peasants politicians
Sportspeople from Yonne
Living people